Belye Medveditsy Chelyabinsk are an ice hockey team in the Zhenskaya Hockey League (ZhHL). They play in Chelyabinsk, Russia at the Yunost Sport Palace. The team has previously been known as Metelitsa Chelyabinsk, Nika Chelyabinsk, Kazak-Uralsky Chelyabinsk, and Fakel Chelyabinsk.

The team is a part of the Traktor Chelyabinsk hockey organization, which also operates Traktor Chelyabinsk of the Kontinental Hockey League (KHL), Chelmet Chelyabinsk of the VHL, Belye Medvedi Chelyabinsk of the MHL, and a number of youth and junior teams.

History 
Founded in Chelyabinsk in 1997 as Metelitsa, the club made its debut in the second round of the 1997–98 Russian Women's Hockey League (RWHL) season. Yelena Tyushnyakova, an ice hockey defenceman better known as an Olympic speed skater, was the first captain of Metelitsa. The team struggled in their inaugural season, recording a -165 goal differential and finishing at the bottom of the league.

Prior to the 1998–99 season, the team was renamed as Nika. In 2000, the name was changed to Kazak-Uralsky. During 2002 to 2014, the team was called Fakel. 

On 5 March 2014, the team joined the HC Tractor organization and their name was changed to Belye Medveditsy. On 8 March 2015, the team was dissolved for financial reasons.

Season-by-season results 
This is a partial list of the last five seasons completed by Belye Medveditsy, known as Fakel Chelyabinsk during 2002 to 2014. 

Note: Finish = Rank at end of regular season; GP = Games played, W = Wins (3 points), OTW = Overtime wins (2 points), OTL = Overtime losses (1 point), L = Losses, GF = Goals for, GA = Goals against, Pts = Points, Top scorer: Points (Goals+Assists)

Players and personnel

2021–22 roster 

Coaching staff and team personnel
 Head coach: Igor Znarok
 Assistant coach: Pyotr Pankov
 Assistant coach: Pavel Shiryayev
 Conditioning coach: Yelena Tyushnyakova

Team captaincy history 

 Yelena Tyushnyakova, 1997–98
 Viktoria Tavakova, 1998–2004
 Yekaterina Vainberger, 2004–05
 Alexandra Vafina, 2008–2011
 Anastasia Vedernikova, 2011–2013
 Alexandra Vafina, 2013–14
 Anastasia Vedernikova, 2014–15

Head coaches 

 Alexander Degtyaryov, 1997–98
 Vladimir Borodulin, 1998–2005
 Arkadi Belousov, 2008–2015
 Igor Znarok, 2021–

Team honours

Russian Championship 
  Third Place (1): 2010–11

All-time scoring leaders 
The top-ten point-scorers in club history.

Note: Nat = Nationality; Pos = Position; GP = Games played; G = Goals; A = Assists; Pts = Points; P/G = Points per game;  = 2021–22 Belye Medveditsy player

Source(s):

Notable alumni 
Years active with Belye Medveditsy listed alongside player name.

 Yekaterina Lebedeva, 2010–2014
 Yekaterina Ananina, 2011–2014
 Yelena Tyushnyakova, 1997–98
 Alexandra Vafina, 2008–2011 & 2013–14

International players
  Fanni Gasparics, 2013–2015
  Alexandra Huszak, 2013–2015
  Franciska Kiss-Simon, 2013–2015
  Varvara Piskunova, 2008–2014
  O'Hara Shipe, 2012–13
  Lyubov Vafina, 2008–2015

References

External links 
 Team information and statistics from EliteProspects.com, or Eurohockey.com, or HockeyArchives.info

 
Women's ice hockey in Russia
Sport in Chelyabinsk
Zhenskaya Hockey League teams